Trapelus boehmei is a species of agama. It is found in at least Mauritania, Morocco, Algeria, and Niger, possibly also in Western Sahara, Mali, and Tunisia. It is named after , German herpetologist.

References

Trapelus
Lizards of Africa
Reptiles of North Africa
Reptiles of West Africa
Taxa named by Jane Melville
Taxa named by Andreas Schmitz
Taxa named by Philipp Wagner
Taxa named by Thomas Wilms
Reptiles described in 2011